Eren Fansa (born 3 June 2003) is a Turkish professional footballer who plays as a centre-back for an amateur side Antakya Belediyespor.

Career
A youth product of Hatayspor, Fansa joined their youth academy at the age of 9. He started training with their first team in 2021. He made his professional debut with Hatayspor in a 5–2 Süper Lig win over Yeni Malatyaspor on 28 February 2022, coming on as a substitute in extra time.

References

External links
 
 

2003 births
Living people
Sportspeople from Hatay
Turkish footballers
Association football defenders
Hatayspor footballers
Süper Lig players